is a 1987 vertical scrolling shooter arcade game developed and published by Data East. It is the sequel to Data East's 1986 arcade game, Darwin 4078. The player takes control of a small fighter ship capable of mutating into different shapes. The ship's appearance will change with upgraded weapons as the player obtain more power-ups.

Plot
The story starts on the planet Lakya where the technologically advanced inhabitants of the planet unwittingly unleash the planet's life force known as Evol. As the released Evol drifts from planet Lakya, it is received by the inhabitants of the nearby planet Cokyo; the people of Cokyo initiate the Shlohe project, a plan to use their captured Evol to develop advanced biologic ships and weapons to invade planet Lakya. The inhabitants of Lakya retaliate the Cokyo invasion by using their own evolving fighter ships.

Ports

SRD: Super Real Darwin was later ported by Sega for the Sega Mega Drive console in 1990 under the title . Although a home port of the second game, Darwin 4081 was numbered 4081 because it was the 4th game that used the evolution system after Darwin (4078), S.R.D. (4079), and Act-Fancer (4080). In 2010, a Wii compilation titled Data East Arcade Classics was released and includes the arcade version of SRD: Super Real Darwin.

Reception 
In Japan, Game Machine listed Super Real Darwin on their December 1, 1987 issue as being the third most-successful table arcade unit of the year.

References

External links
 SRD: Super Real Darwin at Data East Games
 
 SRD: Super Real Darwin at Arcade History

1987 video games
Arcade video games
Data East video games
Vertically scrolling shooters
Shoot 'em ups
Sega Genesis games
Multiplayer and single-player video games
Video games developed in Japan
Data East arcade games